Wagholi is situated within the Pune Metropolitan in the Indian state of Maharashtra. Wagholi is historically kenned as the habitation of Maratha Warrior Sardar Pilajirao Changojirao Jadhavrao. Wagholi was added to the area under Pune Municipal Corporation in 2021. Wagheshwar temple is popular temple at Wagholi. The name Wagholi is derived from the local Marathi word "Wagh" meaning "tiger", and is connected to the temple of Wagheshwar which is located at the entrance to the mining complex 20 km north of Pune.

College and Schools

Jspm's bhivrabai sawant polytechnic ; wagholi pune
 Vishnuji Shekuji Satav Highschool and Jr. College.
 Wagheshwar English School and Junior College
 JSPM Wagholi
 Raisoni Group of Institutions
 Bharatiya Jain Sanghatana's Arts, Commerce & Science College
 G.H. Raisoni College of Engineering & Management
 G.H. Raisoni Institute of Engineering & Technology 
 G.H. Raisoni Institute of Management & Research
 G.H. Raisoni Junior College
 G.H. Raisoni College of Arts, Commerce And Science
 The Lexicon International School Wagholi, Pune
 Prodigy Public School
 Wageshwar Junior College
 Bhatkya Vimukta Jati Shikshan Sanstha Asham School, Bakori Gaon, Behind Jain College, Nagar Road, Wagholi Pune
 EVA WORLD SCHOOL
 Holy Angels Convent High School
 Jspm's Imperial College Of Engineering And Research
 SNBP International School, Wagholi
 Delhi Paramedical and Management Institute-DPMI NexGeN
 Lexicon MILE - Management Institute of Leadership and Excellence
 Rahul International School - CBSE & IGCSE 
 BJS School
 Sankriti School

References 

Geography of Pune district